Jack B. Horner (March 24, 1922 – July 10, 2009) was a Republican member of the Pennsylvania House of Representatives.

Horner was a graduate of Colgate University and Dickinson School of Law. During World War II he served in the Unitecd States Army Air Forces. He first served in elected office as a member of the Elizabethtown Area School Board. He served four terms in the state legislature from 1965-1973.

References

Republican Party members of the Pennsylvania House of Representatives
2009 deaths
1922 births
Colgate University alumni
Dickinson School of Law alumni
United States Army Air Forces personnel of World War II
20th-century American politicians
People from Elizabethtown, Pennsylvania